Major General Friedrich Wilhelm, Graf von Wylich and Lottum (18 March 1716 in Berlin – 17 December 1774) was a Prussian officer, and Commandant of Berlin.

Notes

References
 

1716 births
1774 deaths
Military personnel from Berlin
Major generals of Prussia